Mark Ellsworth Madsen (born January 28, 1976) is an American basketball coach and former NBA player who is the head coach of Utah Valley University of the Western Athletic Conference (WAC). Due to his hustle and physical style of play, he received the nickname "Mad Dog" while playing for the San Ramon Valley High School Wolves - the moniker continued during his time with the Stanford Cardinal and beyond. He played professionally in the National Basketball Association (NBA) with the Los Angeles Lakers, winning two NBA championships. He also played for the Minnesota Timberwolves.

College career
Madsen played NCAA basketball at Stanford, where he finished his career ranked in the school's career top 10 in blocks and rebounds.  In addition, Madsen helped the Cardinal to four NCAA tournament appearances, including a Final Four berth in 1998. Perhaps his signature moment at Stanford was his dunk and free throw that gave Stanford a lead over Rhode Island, propelling the team into the Final Four, where it lost to eventual champion Kentucky. Madsen was a two-time All-American and a two-time All-Pac-10 selection.

Professional career

Los Angeles Lakers (2000–2003) 
The Los Angeles Lakers selected Madsen in the first round (29th pick overall) of the 2000 NBA draft. He contributed to the Lakers' NBA championships in 2001 and 2002, and became well known for his goofy dances at the victory parades for those championships.

Talking about his prime with the Lakers, Shaquille O'Neal said that the only player who could thwart him from his dominant play was Madsen. "He used to beat me up in practice", O'Neal said.

Minnesota Timberwolves (2003–2009) 
Madsen signed with the Timberwolves as a free agent before the start of the 2003–04 NBA season. He played six seasons for the Wolves.

On July 20, 2009, Madsen was traded to the Los Angeles Clippers along with Craig Smith and Sebastian Telfair in exchange for Quentin Richardson. On August 21, 2009, he was waived by the Clippers.

Madsen's final NBA game was played on April 15, 2009 in a 90 - 97 loss to the Sacramento Kings. In his final game Madsen was the team's starting Power Forward, but he played for only 9 and half minutes and recorded no stats. His career averages were 2.2 points, 2.6 rebounds, and 0.4 assists and 11.8 minutes played per game.

Coaching career

Los Angeles D-Fenders (2013) 
Following being waived, Madsen was hired as the assistant coach for the Utah Flash of the NBA Development League (D-League). In 2012, he was hired as an assistant coach at Stanford. On May 13, 2013, he was named head coach of the Los Angeles D-Fenders, a D-League team owned by the Los Angeles Lakers. On July 19, 2013, Madsen was promoted to a player development coach position with the Lakers. On September 16, 2014 Madsen was promoted to full-fledged assistant coach by Byron Scott. After Byron Scott was dismissed as head coach of the Lakers, new head coach Luke Walton retained Madsen as assistant coach on July 1, 2016.

Utah Valley (2019–present) 
Madsen was hired as the head coach at Utah Valley University on April 14, 2019.

Personal life 
Madsen is a member of the Church of Jesus Christ of Latter-day Saints. Madsen speaks Spanish, acquiring the language from a two-year mission abroad in Málaga, Spain on behalf of his church following his graduation from high school.

As a youth, Madsen attained the rank of Eagle Scout and credits Scouting with teaching him about leadership, character and mentoring.

In fall 2010, Madsen enrolled in the Stanford Graduate School of Business.  In June 2012, he received an M.B.A. degree with a Certificate in Public Management.

Madsen married Hannah Harkness on September 3, 2016.

NBA career statistics

Regular season

|-
| style="background:#afe6ba;" align="left" | †
| align="left" | L.A. Lakers
| 70 || 3 || 9.2 || .487 || 1.000 || .703 || 2.2 || .3 || .1 || .1 || 2.0
|- 
| style="background:#afe6ba;" align="left" | †
| align="left" | L.A. Lakers
| 59 || 5 || 11.0 || .452 || .000 || .648 || 2.7 || .7 || .3 || .2 || 2.8
|-
| align="left" | 
| align="left" | L.A. Lakers
| 54 || 22 || 14.5 || .423 || – || .590 || 2.9 || .7 || .3 || .4 || 3.2
|-
| align="left" | 
| align="left" | Minnesota
| 72 || 12 || 17.3 || .495 || .000 || .483 || 3.8 || .4 || .5 || .3 || 3.6
|-
| align="left" | 
| align="left" | Minnesota
| 41 || 14 || 14.7 || .515 || – || .500 || 3.1 || .4 || .2 || .3 || 2.1
|-
| align="left" | 
| align="left" | Minnesota
| 62 || 7 || 10.9 || .409 || .000 || .426 || 2.3 || .2 || .4 || .3 || 1.2
|-
| align="left" | 
| align="left" | Minnesota
| 56 || 0 || 8.4 || .535 || – || .517 || 1.6 || .2 || .2 || .2 || 1.1
|-
| align="left" | 
| align="left" | Minnesota
| 20 || 6 || 7.6 || .158 || – || .250 || 1.9 || .2 || .2 || .1 || .5
|-
| align="left" | 
| align="left" | Minnesota
| 19 || 1 || 6.1 || .214 || – || .000 || .9 || .2 || .1 || .1 || .3
|- class="sortbottom"
| style="text-align:center;" colspan="2"| Career
| 453 || 70 || 11.8 || .457 || .063 || .527 || 2.6 || .4 || .3 || .2 || 2.2

Playoffs

|-
| style="background:#afe6ba;" align="left"| 2001†
| align="left" | L.A. Lakers
| 13 || 0 || 3.7 || .077 || – || .600 || .8 || .3 || .0 || .2 || .4
|-
| style="background:#afe6ba;" align="left"| 2002†
| align="left" | L.A. Lakers
| 7 || 0 || 1.4 || .000 || .000 || – || .3 || .0 || .0 || .0 || .0
|-
| align="left" | 2003
| align="left" | L.A. Lakers
| 12 || 2 || 14.1 || .419 || .000 || .438 || 2.3 || 1.0 || .3 || .2 || 2.8
|-
| align="left" | 2004
| align="left" | Minnesota
| 17 || 0 || 13.1 || .531 || – || .448 || 3.4 || .1 || .3 || .2 || 2.8
|- class="sortbottom"
| style="text-align:center;" colspan="2"| Career
| 49 || 2 || 9.2 || .403 || .000 || .460 || 2.0 || .4 || .2 || .2 || 1.7

Head coaching record

College

 Due to irregularities in the WAC standings due to cancelled games resulted from the ongoing COVID-19 pandemic throughout the season, Utah Valley and Grand Canyon were declared co-champions in the regular season as both teams had 9 wins in conference play. This was contrary to the fact Utah Valley finished with one extra loss and thus an inferior winning percentage in conference play.

References

External links

1976 births
Living people
20th-century Mormon missionaries
All-American college men's basketball players
American expatriate basketball people in Spain
American men's basketball coaches
American men's basketball players
American Mormon missionaries in Spain
Basketball coaches from California
Basketball players from California
College men's basketball head coaches in the United States
Competitors at the 2001 Goodwill Games
Goodwill Games medalists in basketball
Latter Day Saints from California
Los Angeles D-Fenders coaches
Los Angeles Lakers assistant coaches
Los Angeles Lakers draft picks
Los Angeles Lakers players
Medalists at the 1999 Summer Universiade
Minnesota Timberwolves players
Power forwards (basketball)
Sportspeople from Walnut Creek, California
Stanford Cardinal men's basketball coaches
Stanford Cardinal men's basketball players
Universiade gold medalists for the United States
Universiade medalists in basketball
Utah Flash coaches
Utah Valley Wolverines men's basketball coaches